Galla Placidia (388–89/392–93 – 27 November 450), daughter of the Roman emperor Theodosius I, was a mother, tutor, and advisor to emperor Valentinian III, and a major force in Roman politics for most of her life.  She was queen consort to Ataulf, king of the Visigoths from 414 until his death in 415, briefly empress consort to Constantius III in 421, and managed the government administration as a regent during the early reign of Valentinian III, until her death.

Family
Placidia was the daughter of Theodosius I and his second wife, Galla, who was herself daughter of Valentinian I and his second wife, Justina. Galla Placidia's date of birth is not recorded, but she must have been born either in the period 388–89 or 392–93. Between these dates, her father was in Italy following his campaign against the usurper Magnus Maximus, while her mother remained in Constantinople.

A surviving letter from Bishop Ambrose of Milan, dated 390, refers to a younger son of Theodosius named Gratianus, who died in infancy; as Gratian must have been born in the period 388–89, it is most probable that Galla Placidia was born during the second period, 392–93. Placidia's mother Galla died some time in 394, perhaps giving birth to a stillborn son.

Placidia was a younger, paternal half-sister of emperors Arcadius and Honorius. Her older half-sister Pulcheria predeceased her parents according to Gregory of Nyssa, placing the death of Pulcheria prior to the death of Aelia Flaccilla, the first wife of Theodosius I, in 385. Coins issued in Placidia's honour in Constantinople after 425 give her name as AELIA PLACIDIA; this may have been intended to integrate Placidia with the eastern dynasty of Theodosius II. There is no evidence that the name Aelia was ever used in the west, or that it formed part of Placidia's official nomenclature.

Early life
Placidia was granted her own household by her father in the early 390s and was thus financially independent while underage. She was summoned to the court of her father in Mediolanum (Milan) during 394, and was present at Theodosius' death on 17 January 395. She was granted the title of "nobilissima puella" ("most noble girl") during her childhood.

Placidia spent most of her early years in the household of Stilicho and his wife, Serena. She is presumed to have learned weaving and embroidery. She might have also been given a classical education. Serena was a first cousin of Arcadius, Honorius and Placidia. The poem "In Praise of Serena" by Claudian and the Historia Nova by Zosimus clarify that Serena's father was an elder Honorius, a brother to Theodosius I. According to "De Consulatu Stilichonis" by Claudian, Placidia was betrothed to Eucherius, only known son of Stilicho and Serena. Her scheduled marriage is mentioned in the text as the third union between Stilicho's family and the Theodosian dynasty, following those of Stilicho to Serena and Maria, their daughter, to Honorius.

Stilicho was the magister militum of the Western Roman Empire. He was the only known person to hold the rank of "magister militum in praesenti" from 394 to 408 in both the Western and the Eastern Roman Empire. He was also titled "magister equitum et peditum" ("Master of the Horse and of Foot"), placing him in charge of both the cavalry and infantry forces of the Western Roman Empire. In 408, Arcadius died and was succeeded by his son Theodosius II, only seven years old. Stilicho planned to proceed to Constantinople and "undertake the management of the affairs of Theodosius", convincing Honorius not to travel to the East himself. Shortly after, Olympius, 'Magister Scrinii', attempted to convince Honorius that Stilicho was in fact conspiring to depose Theodosius II, to replace him with Eucherius. Olympius proceeded to lead a military coup d'état which left him in control of Honorius and his court. Stilicho was arrested and executed on 22 August 408. Eucherius sought refuge in Rome but was arrested there and executed by the eunuchs Arsacius and Tarentius, on imperial orders. Honorius appointed Tarentius imperial chamberlain, and gave the next post under him to Arsacius.

First marriage

In the disturbances that followed the fall of Stilicho, wives and children of foederati living in the cities of Italy were killed. Most of the foederati, regarded as loyal to Stilicho, joined the forces of Alaric I, King of the Visigoths. Alaric led them to Rome and put it under siege, with minor interruptions, from autumn 408 to 24 August 410. Zosimus records that Placidia was within the city during the siege. When Serena was accused of conspiring with Alaric, "the whole senate therefore, with Placidia, uterine sister to the emperor, thought it proper that she should suffer death".

Placidia was captured by Alaric before the fall of Rome, and accompanied the Visigoths from Italy to Gaul in 412. Their ruler Ataulf, having succeeded Alaric, entered an alliance with Honorius against Jovinus and Sebastianus, rival Western Roman emperors located in Gaul, and managed to defeat and execute both in 413.

After the heads of Sebastianus and Jovinus arrived at Honorius' court in Ravenna in late August, to be forwarded for display among other usurpers on the walls of Carthage, relations between Ataulf and Honorius improved sufficiently for Ataulf to cement them by marrying Galla Placidia at Narbonne on 1 January 414. The nuptials were celebrated with high Roman festivities and magnificent gifts. Priscus Attalus gave the wedding speech, a classical epithalamium. The marriage was recorded by Hydatius and Jordanes, although the latter states that it was earlier, in 411 at Forum Livii (Forlì) (possibly a more informal event).

Placidia and Ataulf had one son, Theodosius, born in Barcelona by the end of 414, but the child died early in the following year, eliminating an opportunity for a Romano-Visigothic line; years later the corpse was exhumed and reburied in the imperial mausoleum in Old St. Peter's Basilica, Rome. In Hispania, Ataulf imprudently accepted into his service a man identified as "Dubius" or "Eberwolf", a former follower of Sarus. Sarus had been a Germanic chieftain killed while fighting under Jovinus and Sebastianus, and his follower harbored a secret desire to avenge the death of his patron. In August/September, 415, in the palace at Barcelona, the man brought Ataulf's reign to a sudden end by killing him while he bathed.

The Amali faction proceeded to proclaim Sigeric, a brother of Sarus, as the next king of the Visigoths. Sigeric killed Ataulf's six children from a former wife by taking them away from Sigesar, bishop of the Goths. Galla Placidia, Ataulf's widow, was forced to walk more than twelve miles on foot among the crowd of captives driven ahead of the mounted Sigeric. After 7 days of ruling, Sigeric was assassinated and replaced with Wallia, Ataulf's relative.

Second marriage

According to the Chronicon Albeldense, included in the Códice de Roda, Wallia was desperate for food supplies. He surrendered to Constantius III, at the time magister militum of Honorius, negotiating terms giving foederati status for the Visigoths. Placidia was returned to Honorius as part of the peace treaty. Her brother Honorius forced her into marriage to Constantius III on 1 January 417. Their daughter Justa Grata Honoria was probably born in 417 or 418. The history of Paul the Deacon mentions her first among the children of the marriage, suggesting that she was the eldest. Their son Valentinian III was born 2 July 419.

Placidia intervened in the succession crisis following the death of Pope Zosimus on 26 December 418. Two factions of the Roman clergy had proceeded to elect their own popes, the first electing Eulalius (27 December) and the other electing Boniface I (28 December). They acted as rival popes, both in Rome, and their factions plunged the city into tumult. Symmachus, Prefect of Rome, sent his report to the imperial court at Ravenna, requesting an imperial decision on the matter. Placidia and, presumably, Constantius petitioned the emperor in favor of Eulalius. This was arguably the first intervention by an Emperor in the Papal election.

Honorius initially confirmed Eulalius as the legitimate pope. As this failed to put an end to the controversy, Honorius called a synod of Italian bishops at Ravenna to decide the matter. The synod met from February to March 419 but failed to reach a conclusion. Honorius called a second synod in May, this time including Gaulish and African bishops. In the meantime, the two rival popes were ordered to leave Rome. As Easter approached, however, Eulalius returned to the city and attempted to seize the Basilica of St. John Lateran in order to "preside at the paschal ceremonies". Imperial troops managed to repel him, and on Easter (30 March 419) the ceremonies were led by Achilleus, Bishop of Spoleto. The conflict cost Eulalius the imperial favor, and Boniface was proclaimed the legitimate pope as of 3 April 419, returning to Rome a week later. Placidia had personally written to the African bishops, summoning them to the second synod. Three of her letters are known to have survived.

On 8 February 421, Constantius was proclaimed an Augustus, becoming co-ruler with the childless Honorius. Placidia was proclaimed an Augusta. She was the only Empress in the West, since Honorius had divorced his second wife Thermantia in 408 and had never remarried. Neither title was recognised by Theodosius II, the Eastern Roman Emperor. Constantius reportedly complained about the loss of personal freedom and privacy that came with the imperial office. He died of an illness on 2 September 421.

Widow
 
According to Olympiodorus of Thebes, a historian used as a source by Zosimus, Sozomen and probably Philostorgius, the public grew suspicious of the increasingly scandalous public caresses she was said to have received from her own brother Honorius after her husband's death. However, the siblings' relationship suddenly turned hostile, and around this time, she may have plotted against him. After her soldiers clashed with those of Honorius, Galla Placidia herself was now forced to flee to Constantinople with her children. Despite this setback, Bonifacius, governor of the Diocese of Africa continued to be loyal to her.

Placidia, Valentinian, and Honoria arrived in Constantinople around 422/423. On 15 August 423, Honorius died of edema, perhaps pulmonary edema. With no member of the Theodosian dynasty present at Ravenna to claim the throne, Theodosius II was expected to nominate a Western co-emperor. However, Theodosius hesitated and the decision was delayed. Taking advantage of the power vacuum, Castinus the Patrician proceeded to become a kingmaker. He declared Joannes, the primicerius notariorum "chief notary" (the head of the civil service), to be the new Western Roman Emperor. Among their supporters was Flavius Aetius. Joannes' rule was accepted in the provinces of Italia, Gaul and Hispania, but not in the province of Africa.

Theodosius II reacted by preparing Valentinian III for eventual promotion to the imperial office. In 423/424, Valentinian was named nobilissimus. In 424, Valentinian was betrothed to Licinia Eudoxia, his first cousin once removed. She was a daughter of Theodosius II and Aelia Eudocia. The year of their betrothal was recorded by Marcellinus Comes. At the time of their betrothal, Valentinian was approximately four years old, Licinia only two.

The campaign against Joannes also started in the same year. Forces of the Eastern Roman army gathered at Thessaloniki, and were placed under the general command of Ardaburius, who had served in the Roman-Persian War. The invasion force was to cross the Adriatic Sea by two routes. Aspar, son of Ardaburius, led the cavalry by land, following the coast of the Adriatic from the Western Balkans to Northern Italy. Placidia and Valentinian joined this force. Along the way, Valentinian was proclaimed Caesar by Helion, a magister officiorum under Theodosius in 23 October 424.

Ardaburius and the infantry boarded ships of the Eastern Roman navy in an attempt to reach Ravenna by sea. Aspar marched his forces to Aquileia, taking the city by surprise and with virtually no resistance. The fleet, on the other hand, was dispersed by a storm. Ardaburius and two of his galleys were captured by forces loyal to Joannes and were held prisoners in Ravenna. Ardaburius was treated well by Joannes, who probably intended to negotiate with Theodosius for an end to the hostilities. The prisoner was allowed the "courteous freedom" of walking the court and streets of Ravenna during his captivity. He took advantage of this privilege to come into contact with the forces of Joannes and convinced some of them to defect to Theodosius' side. The conspirators contacted Aspar and beckoned him to Ravenna. A shepherd led Aspar's cavalry force through the marshes of the Po to the gates of Ravenna; with the besiegers outside the walls and the defectors within, the city was quickly captured. Joannes was taken and his right hand cut off; he was then mounted on a donkey and paraded through the streets, and finally beheaded in the hippodrome of Aquileia.

With Joannes dead, Valentinian was officially proclaimed the new Augustus of the Western Roman Empire on 23 October 425, by Helion, in the presence of the Roman Senate, with Theodosius II's support. Three days following Joannes' death, Aetius brought reinforcements for his army, a reported number of sixty thousand Huns from across the Danube. After some skirmishing, Placidia, Valentinian and Aetius came to an agreement and established peace. The Huns were paid off and sent home, while Aetius received the position of comes and magister militum per Gallias (commander-in-chief of the Roman army in Gaul).

Regent

Galla Placidia was regent of the Western Roman Empire until Aetius' rise. Among her early supporters were Bonifacius and Felix. Aetius, their rival for influence, managed to secure Arles against Theodoric I of the Visigoths. The Visigoths concluded a treaty and were given Gallic noblemen as hostages. The later Emperor Avitus visited Theodoric, lived at his court and taught his sons. Felix, her ally, was assassinated in 430, possibly by Aetius.

Conflict between Bonifacius and Aetius
Conflict between Placidia and Bonifacius started in 429. Placidia appointed Bonifacius general of Libya. Procopius records that Aetius played the two against each other, warning Placidia against Bonifacius and advising her to recall him to Rome; simultaneously writing to Bonifacius, warning him that Placidia was about to summon him for no good reason in order to put him away.

Bonifacius, trusting the warning from Aetius, refused the summons; and, thinking his position untenable, sought an alliance with the Vandals in Spain. The Vandals subsequently crossed from Spain into Libya to join him. To friends of Bonifacius in Rome, this apparent act of hostility toward the Empire seemed entirely out of character for Bonifacius. They traveled to Carthage at Placidia's behest to intercede with him, and he showed them the letter from Aetius. The plot now revealed, his friends returned to Rome to apprise Placidia of the true situation. She did not move against Aetius, as he wielded great influence, and as the Empire was already in danger; but she urged Bonifacius to return to Rome "and not to permit the empire of the Romans to lie under the hand of barbarians."

Bonifacius now regretted his alliance with the Vandals and tried to persuade them to return to Spain. Gaiseric offered battle instead, and Bonifacius was besieged at Hippo Regius in Numidia by the sea (Augustine of Hippo was its bishop and died in this siege). Unable to take the city, the Vandals eventually raised the siege. The Romans, with reinforcements under Aspar, renewed the struggle but were routed and lost Africa to the Vandals.

Bonifacius had meanwhile returned to Rome, where Placidia raised him to the rank of patrician and made him "master-general of the Roman armies". Aetius returned from Gaul with an army of "barbarians", and was met by Bonifacius in the bloody Battle of Ravenna (432). Bonifacius won the battle, but was mortally wounded and died a few days later. Aetius was compelled to retire to Pannonia.

Rise of Aetius
With the generals loyal to her having either died or defected to Aetius, Placidia acknowledged Aetius' political role as legitimate. In 433, Aetius was given the titles "magister militum" and "patrician". The appointments effectively left Aetius in control of the entire Western Roman army and gave him considerable influence over imperial policy. Aetius later played a pivotal role in the defense of the Western Empire against Attila. Placidia continued to act as regent until 437, though her direct influence over decisions was diminished. She would continue to exercise political influence until her death in 450—no longer, however, the only power at court.

During these years, Galla Placidia befriended bishop Peter Chrysologus, both having a shared interest in building churches.

Attila was diverted from Constantinople towards Italy by a letter from Placidia's own daughter Justa Grata Honoria in the spring of 450, asking him to rescue her from an unwanted marriage to a Roman senator that the Imperial family, including Placidia, was trying to force upon her. Honoria included her engagement ring with the letter. Though Honoria may not have intended a proposal of marriage, Attila chose to interpret her message as such. He accepted, asking for half of the western Empire as dowry. When Valentinian discovered the plan, only the influence of Placidia persuaded him not to kill Honoria. Valentinian wrote to Attila denying the legitimacy of the supposed marriage proposal. Attila, unconvinced, sent an emissary to Ravenna to proclaim that Honoria was innocent, that the proposal had been legitimate, and that he would come to claim what was rightfully his. Honoria was quickly married to Flavius Bassus Herculanus, though this did not prevent Attila from pressing his claim.

Placidia died shortly afterwards at Rome, in November 450, and was buried in the Theodosian family mausoleum adjacent to Old St. Peter's Basilica, later the chapel of Saint Petronilla. She did not live to see Attila ravage Italy in 451–453, using Honoria's letter as his "legitimate" excuse.

Public works
Being a devout Christian, she was involved in the building and restoration of various churches throughout her period of influence. She restored and expanded the Basilica of Saint Paul Outside the Walls in Rome and the Church of the Holy Sepulchre in Jerusalem. She built San Giovanni Evangelista, Ravenna in thanks for the sparing of her life and those of her children in a storm while crossing the Adriatic Sea. The dedicatory inscription reads "Galla Placidia, along with her son Placidus Valentinian Augustus and her daughter Justa Grata Honoria Augusta, paid off their vow for their liberation from the danger of the sea."

Her Mausoleum in Ravenna was one of the UNESCO World Heritage Sites inscribed in 1996. However, the building never served as her tomb, but was initially erected as a chapel dedicated to Lawrence of Rome. It is unknown whether the sarcophagi therein contained the bodies of other members of the Theodosian dynasty, or when they were placed in the building.

In literature
 Two stanzas in Alexander Blok's poem "Ravenna" (May–June 1909) focus on her tomb; Olga Matich writes: "For Blok, Galla Placidia represented a synthetic historical figure that linked different cultural histories."
 Ezra Pound uses her tomb as an exemplar of the "gold" remaining from the past, for example in Canto XXI: "Gold fades in the gloom,/ Under the blue-black roof, Placidia's..."
 Louis Zukofsky refers to it in his poem "4 Other Countries", reproduced in "A" 17: "The gold that shines/ in the dark/ of Galla Placidia,/ the gold in the// Round vault rug of stone/ that shows its pattern as well as the stars/ my love might want on her floor..."
 Carl Jung refers to Galla Placidia in his autobiography Memories, Dreams, Reflections, (Chapter IX, Section 'Ravenna and Rome'). He reports a vision of "four great mosaic frescoes of incredible beauty" he experienced in the Neonian Baptistery right after visiting Galla's tomb at Ravenna. He had been, he says, "personally affected by the figure of Galla Placidia" and goes on to say: "Her tomb seemed to me a final legacy through which I might reach her personality. Her fate and her whole being were vivid presences to me". Jung was later surprised to discover that the mosaics he and an acquaintance remembered had actually never existed.
 Galla Placidia is a major supporting character in R. A. Lafferty's semi-historical work The Fall of Rome, which introduces her as "the goblin child and sister of the two young emperors who, at the age of seventeen, and when all the rest of them were cowed, seized control of the Roman Senate and the City and represented the defiance in the last one hundred days of the world."

In popular culture

 Galla Placidia is represented in the BBC's Ancient Rome: The Rise and Fall of an Empire by Natasha Barrero.
 Spanish musician Jaume Pahissa wrote the opera Galla Placídia in 1913.
 Galla Placidia is played by Colette Régis in the 1954 film Attila.
 Galla Placidia is played by Alice Krige in the 2001 American TV miniseries Attila.

Notes

References

Further reading
 McEvoy, M. A. (2013), Child Emperor Rule in the Late Roman West, AD 367–455, Oxford University Press.

External links

 Pictures of the mausoleum of Galla Placidia
 Entry of Aelia Flaccilla in the Dictionary of Greek and Roman Biography and Mythology 
 Zosimus, New History. London: Green and Chaplin (1814). Book 5.

388 births
450 deaths
5th-century Christians
5th-century Roman empresses
5th-century viceregal rulers
Augustae
Daughters of Roman emperors
Last of the Romans
Nobilissimi
Remarried royal consorts
Theodosian dynasty
Visigothic queens consort
Valentinianic dynasty
5th-century women rulers